Patrick Martins Vieira or simply Patrick Vieira (born 11 January 1992), is a Brazilian footballer who currently plays for São Bento as an attacking midfielder.

Club career
He started his career playing for Botafogo and Palmeiras, before having a loan spell in Japan with Yokohama FC. He later returned to Brazil to play for Náutico, São Bernardo, Londrina and Santa Cruz. Later on, he transferred to Saudi club Najran, before joining Egyptian club Ismaily in October 2020.

References

External links

1992 births
Living people
Brazilian footballers
Brazilian expatriate footballers
Sociedade Esportiva Palmeiras players
Yokohama FC players
Clube Náutico Capibaribe players
São Bernardo Futebol Clube players
Londrina Esporte Clube players
Santa Cruz Futebol Clube players
Najran SC players
Ismaily SC players
Esporte Clube São Bento players
Campeonato Brasileiro Série A players
J2 League players
Saudi First Division League players
Egyptian Premier League players
Expatriate footballers in Japan
Expatriate footballers in Saudi Arabia
Expatriate footballers in Egypt
Brazilian expatriate sportspeople in Japan
Brazilian expatriate sportspeople in Saudi Arabia
Brazilian expatriate sportspeople in Egypt
Association football midfielders
Footballers from Rio de Janeiro (city)